Octachlorodibenzodioxin (can be abbreviated as OCDD) is one of polychlorinated dibenzodioxins (PCDDs).

Its toxicity is similar to TCDD, but it is about 3000 times weaker.

It is one of the dominant dioxin congeners in smoke emissions, but because it is much less soluble than e.g. TCDD, it is not bioaccumulated as effectively and it is toxicologically less important than the most prevalent dioxins.
(for details see Dioxins and dioxin-like compounds).

Chlorinated pesticides can also contain impurities of dibenzo-p-dioxins and dibenzofurans (PCDD/Fs) and their precursors. "Precursor formation of PCDD/Fs can also be mediated by ultraviolet light (UV)" from sun (OCDD mostly). Changes in congeners ratio after UV exposition suggest that pesticide sources of dioxines-like after sunlight exposure "may not be recognized based on matching source fingerprints established from manufacturing impurities. These changes also provide preliminary insights into the possible formation routes and types of precursors involved".

References

Chloroarenes
Dibenzodioxins